Ajdov Kruh is a type of bread that is consumed mainly in central Slovenia. The ingredients are Buckwheat flour, water, potato, cake yeast, and salt.

References

External links 
 Ajdov Kruh recipe on Recidemia

Slovenian cuisine